The Monteverdi Choir was founded in 1964 by Sir John Eliot Gardiner for a performance of the Vespro della Beata Vergine in King's College Chapel, Cambridge. A specialist Baroque ensemble, the Choir has become famous for its stylistic conviction and extensive repertoire, encompassing music from the Renaissance period to Classical music of the 20th century. They often appear with John Eliot Gardiner's orchestras, the English Baroque Soloists and Orchestre Révolutionnaire et Romantique.

In 2000, the 250th anniversary of Johann Sebastian Bach's death, the choir undertook the Bach Cantata Pilgrimage, performing and recording most of his church cantatas in more than 60 historic churches throughout Europe, and some in the U.S.

On 5 March 2014 the Choir celebrated its 50th anniversary with a repeat performance of the Monteverdi Vespers from King's College Chapel, in a live broadcast live by BBC Radio 3.

Bach Cantata Pilgrimage 

In 2000 the Choir, with the English Baroque Soloists, undertook an ambitious tour, the Bach Cantata Pilgrimage, in which it performed almost all of Johann Sebastian Bach's church cantatas in more than 60 churches in Europe, the UK and the US to celebrate the 250th anniversary of the composer's death. The dates followed the occasions of the liturgical year for which Bach had assigned his compositions. Some of the churches are connected to Bach's life.

Recordings of a number of the cantatas were released by Deutsche Grammophon on the Archiv label. However, most of the recordings made during the Bach Cantata Pilgrimage have been released in 28 volumes on Gardiner's own label, Soli Deo Gloria (recordings released by Deutsche Grammophon will not be released again on Soli Deo Gloria). The series was completed in 2012 with a live recording in London of cantatas for Ascension Day that were performed in Salisbury during the pilgrimage, but were not recorded for technical reasons.  It is possible that some cantatas which were not performed during the pilgrimage will be added to the recording project, such as works for the inauguration of the Leipzig town council.

Discography
All recordings mentioned are with the English Baroque Soloists or Orchestre Révolutionnaire et Romantique, conducted by Sir John Eliot Gardiner, unless otherwise stated.

Johann Sebastian Bach

Cantatas
Easter Cantatas: BWV 6, BWV 66 — 2000 — Archiv Produktion 463 580-2
Cantatas: BWV 106, BWV 118/BWV 231, BWV 198 — 1990 — Archiv Produktion 463 581-2
Cantatas for the 3rd Sunday after Epiphany: BWV 72, BWV 73, BWV 111, BWV 156 — 2000 — Archiv Produktion 463 582-2( recorded live on the Bach Cantata Pilgrimage, Milan, January 2000)
Cantatas for Ascension Day: BWV 43, BWV 128, BWV 37, BWV 11 — 2000 — Archiv Produktion 463 583-2
Whitsun Cantatas: BWV 172, BWV 59, BWV 74, BWV 34 — 2000 — Archiv Produktion 463 584-2
Cantatas for the Feast of the Purification of Mary: BWV 83, BWV 82, BWV 125, BWV 200 — 2000 — Archiv Produktion 463 585-2 (recorded live on the Bach Cantata Pilgrimage, Christchurch, February 2000)
Cantatas: BWV 98, BWV 139, BWV 16 — 2000 — Archiv Produktion 463 586-2
Cantatas: BWV 140, BWV 147 — 1992 — Archiv Produktion 463 587-2
Advent Cantatas: BWV 61, BWV 36, BWV 62 — 1992 — Archiv Produktion 463 588-2
Christmas Cantatas: BWV 63, BWV 64, BWV 121, BWV 133 — 2000 — Archiv Produktion 463 589-2
Cantatas for the 9th Sunday after Trinity: BWV 94, BWV 168, BWV 105 — 2000 — Archiv Produktion 463 590-2 (recorded live on the Bach Cantata Pilgrimage, Merano, August 2000)
Cantatas for the 11th Sunday after Trinity: BWV 179, BWV 199, BWV 113 — 2000 — Archiv Produktion 463 591-2 (recorded live on the Bach Cantata Pilgrimage, St Davids, September 2000)
Cantatas for the 2nd Sunday after Epiphany: BWV 155, BWV 3, BWV 13 and Cantatas for the 4th Sunday after Epiphany: BWV BWV 81, BWV 14, BWV 26, Motet BWV 227 (2 CDs) — 2005 — SDG 115
Cantatas for the Feast of St. John the Baptist: BWV 167, BWV 7, BWV 30 and Cantatas for the 1st Sunday after Trinity: BWV 75, BWV 20, BWV 39 (2 CDs) — 2005 — SDG 101
Cantatas for the 15th Sunday after Trinity: BWV 138, BWV 99, BWV 51, BWV 100 and Cantatas for the 16th Sunday after Trinity: BWV 161, BWV 27, BWV 8, BWV 95 (2 CDs) —2005 — SDG 104
Cantatas for the 3rd Sunday after Easter (Jubilate): BWV 12, BWV 103, BWV 146 and Cantatas for the 4th Sunday after Easter: BWV 166, BWV 108, BWV 117 (2 CDs) — 2005 — SDG 107
Cantatas for the 19th Sunday after Trinity: BWV 48, BWV 5, BWV 90, BWV 56 and Cantatas for the Feast of the Reformation: BWV 79, BWV 192, BWV 80 (2 CDs) — 2005 — SDG 110
Alles mit Gott, BWV 1127 & Arias and Choruses from Cantatas BWV 71, BWV 78, BWV 151, BWV 155, BWV 159, BWV 182, BWV 190 — 2005 — SDG 114
Cantatas for the Christmas Day & for the 2nd day of Christmas: BWV 91, BWV 121, BWV 40, BWV 110 — 2005 — SDG 113

Other works
Mass in B minor, BWV 232 — 1985 — Archiv Produktion 415 514-2
St Matthew Passion, BWV 244 — 1989 — Archiv Produktion 427 648-2
St John Passion, BWV 245 — 1986 — Archiv Produktion 419 324-2
Magnificat, BWV 243 and Cantata: BWV 51 (with Emma Kirkby) — 1985 — Philips Classics 464 672-2

Other composers

Claudio Monteverdi
Vespro della Beata Vergine (with the Monteverdi Orchestra) — 1975 —  Decca SET 593-4 
Vespro della Beata Vergine and Magnificat a sei voci — 1990 — Archiv Produktion 429 565-2
Vespro della Beata Vergine and motets by Giovanni Gabrieli, Giovanni Bassano & Claudio Monteverdi (2 CDs) — 1994 — Decca

Antonio Vivaldi
Gloria in D major, RV 589 — 2001 — Philips Classics 462 597-2

George Frideric Handel
Messiah — 1982 — Philips Classics 411 041-2
Dixit Dominus —2001 — Philips Classics 462 597-2
Semele (live) — 2019 — SDG733

Christoph Willibald Gluck
Orfeo ed Euridice — 1993 — Philips Classics 434 093-2

Joseph Haydn
Die Jahreszeiten (The Seasons), Hob. XXI:3 — 1992 — Archiv Produktion 431 818-2
Die Schöpfung (The Creation), Hob. XXI:2 — 1996 — Archiv Produktion 449 217-2

Wolfgang Amadeus Mozart
Requiem, KV 626 and Kyrie in D minor, KV 341 — 1986 — Philips Classics
Great Mass in C minor, "Great" Mass, K. 427 — 1986 — Philips Classics
Idomeneo — 1991 — Archiv Produktion 431 674-2
La clemenza di Tito — 1991 — Archiv Produktion 431 806-2
Die Entführung aus dem Serail — 1992 — Archiv Produktion 435 857-2
Così fan tutte — 1993 — Archiv Produktion 437 829-2
Le Nozze di Figaro — 1994 — Archiv Produktion 439 871-2
Don Giovanni — 1995 — Archiv Produktion 445 870-2
Die Zauberflöte — 1996 — Archiv Produktion 449 166-2

Ludwig van Beethoven
Missa Solemnis, op. 123 — 1990 — Archiv Produktion 429 779-2
Messe in C, op. 86, op. 65, and Kantate op. 112: Meeresstille und glückliche Fahrt — 1992 — Archiv Produktion 435 391-2
Symphony No. 9 in D minor, op. 125 — 1994 — Archiv Produktion 447 074-2

Hector Berlioz
Symphonie fantastique — 1993 — Philips Classics 434 402-2

Robert Schumann
Das Paradies und die Peri, Requiem für Mignon, Nachtlied — 1999 — Archiv Produktion 457 660-2

Giuseppe Verdi
Requiem, Quattro Pezzi Sacri — 1995 — Philips Classics 442 142-2

Johannes Brahms
Ein deutsches Requiem, op. 45 - 1991 - Philips 432 140-2

Alessandro Scarlatti 

 Stabat Mater — 2020 — Erato OCLC 1154312842

Other recordings
Once As I Remember... (Christmas music) — 1998 — Philips 462050
Music of the Chapels Royal (music by Henry Purcell, Matthew Locke, John Blow, and Pelham Humfrey) — 2002 — apex 0927 44352 2
Membra Jesu Nostri by Buxtehude and O bone Jesu, fili Mariae (SWV 471), a Sacred concerto by Schütz — Archiv Produktion 447 298-2

References

External links
Monteverdi Choir & Orchestra - official webpage
Bach Cantata Pilgrimage
Cantatafinder - search tool dedicated to the live recordings made during the BCP under the SDG label

British early music ensembles
Early music choirs
Cambridge choirs
Musical groups established in 1964
1964 establishments in England

Claudio Monteverdi